Rustenburg (Afrikaans and Dutch: City of Rest) is a city at the foot of the Magaliesberg mountain range. Rustenburg is the most populous city in North West province, South Africa (549,575 in 2011 and 626,522 in the 2016 census). In 2017, the city's Gross Domestic Product (GDP) reached ZAR 63.8 billion, accounting for 21.1% of the GDP of the North West Province, and 1.28% of the GDP of South Africa.  Rustenburg was one of the official host cities of the 2010 FIFA World Cup, being in close proximity to Phokeng, the capital of the Royal Bafokeng Nation, where the Royal Bafokeng Stadium is located. The England national football team also used this as their base camp for the tournament.

History

Mfecane

Before European settlers arrived, the area had been settled by agrarian Setswana-speaking tribes

Rustenburg's population is primarily Tswana people.  Partially belonging to the Royal Bafokeng Nation, extensive landowners earning royalties from mining operations. The Royal Bafokeng are descendants of Sotho settlers who displaced the local tribes from the region, which they came to call 'place of dew' (Phokeng). In the early 1800s, the Bafokeng and other Tswana communities were conquered in a series of devastating wars launched by an offshoot of the Zulu kingdom, called the Matebele.  The Boers had also fought the Zulu and Matebele, and so the Boers and Tswana found in the Matebele a common enemy.  The Tswana and Boers planned together and worked toward defeating the Matebele from a Sotho-Tswana kingdom to the south, and together, they defeated the Matebele.  As the Boers settled in the area, called their settlement Rustenburg because they had relatively friendly relations with their Bafokeng allies in the area, and after the many violent military conflicts with other African chiefdoms, such as the Matebele, they believed they could rest ("rusten" in Dutch) in this settlement, whose name literally means "Resting Town."  Although had already long lived in the area when the Boers arrived, the Bafokeng bought land rights from the Boers, and they purchased their first tracts of land in the late nineteenth and early twentieth century from the colonial rulers, some in exchange for serving in the Boer Wars. Although these land purchases were technically illegal, Paul Kruger, who would become a president of the Transvaal Boer Republic, but was then a veld kornet, was friendly to the Bafokeng and helped arrange many of these purchases. A public hospital has been named after Paul Kruger.

Establishment

Rustenburg was established in 1851 as an administrative centre for an Afrikaner farming area that produced citrus fruit, tobacco, peanuts, sunflower seeds, maize, wheat and cattle.  On 10 February 1859, the Reformed Churches in South Africa was founded under a Syringa tree, now commemorated with a memorial. Rustenburg was the home of Paul Kruger, president of the South African Republic, who bought a 5 square kilometer farm to the north-west of the town in 1863. The homestead on his farm, Boekenhoutfontein, is now the Paul Kruger Country Museum. When the Boer and the British came to blows in the Second Boer War (1899), the territory around Rustenburg became a battlefield. The two sides clashed at nearby Mafikeng, where the British garrison found itself under siege for months.

Among the early residents of Rustenburg were settlers of Indian origin. One of the first families of Indian origin was the Bhyat family, whose contribution to the city's history was marked by the renaming of a major street name to Fatima Bhayat Street in honour of Fatima Bhyat who arrived in Rustenburg with her husband in 1877.

Platinum mining in Rustenburg began in 1929, shortly after the discovery of the Platinum Reef by Hans Merensky, later named the Merensky Reef. The mine is located about 3 km from the town centre and owned and managed by the Anglo American plc. According to legend, the farmer that owned the land sold the mineral rights to Anglo American for R10 000.

Post-Apartheid
The township of Boitekong on the northeast side of Rustenburg has one of the highest incidences of AIDS orphans in South Africa Rustenburg was the venue for World AIDS Day commemoration in December 2010. The township is in a geographical area which bears the brunt of the catchment area of the toxic effects of the mining industry coupled with a very poor quality of water supply from the local Bospoort Dam, the water from which was for decades considered too toxic for human consumption until water shortages in the nineties compelled the purification and supply to Boitekong. Life for the majority under the rule of the 'Royal Bafokeng' has parallels to the apartheid era.  In the Apartheid era, forced removals of old settlements were on the basis of racial divide whereas now it is done for installation of massive mining operations sometimes engulfing entire villages.

The Royal Bafokeng company own the stadium selected as a World Cup 2010 venue, the only 'private' stadium that hosted games in the 2010 World cup. The Royal Bafokeng regard themselves as a 'separate nation' which is in contradiction to the Rainbow nation espoused by Desmond Tutu and Nelson Mandela. This 'nationhood' is regarded by many today as a divide and rule tactic orchestrated by the mining conglomerates which has subsequently led to the calls for nationalization of the mining industry by the ANC Youth League. The majority of people in the region 20 years after the fall of apartheid still live in abject poverty despite the massive profits yielded by the platinum royalties. This has led in recent years to claims of kleptocracy against the 'royal' family and land claim disputes.

Agriculture in the region has been in constant decline since the decimation of the vast citrus estates of Rustenburg in the 1970s and 1980s due to pollution from increased smelting and beneficiating processes by mines. There are only a fraction of the original citrus farms remaining.

In 1990, the first post-Apartheid conference between the Nederduits Gereformeerde Kerk (the Dutch Reformed Church in Africa) and the South African churches was held in Rustenburg. During this conference, professor Willie Jonker of the University of Stellenbosch made this confession on behalf of the entire DRC:
"[I] confess before you and before the Lord, not only my own sin and guilt,
and my personal responsibility for the political, social, economic and structural wrongs that have been done to many of you and the results [from] which you and our whole country are still suffering, but vicariously I dare also to do that in the name of the NGK [the white DRC], of which I am a member, and for the Afrikaans people as a whole."
The conference finally resulted in the signing of the Rustenburg Declaration, which moved strongly toward complete confession, forgiveness, and restitution.

Climate
Rustenburg has a humid subtropical climate (Köppen Cwa), with a relatively high degree of diurnal temperature variation due to the high elevation. It has very warm summers (from December to February) and mild winters (from June to August). Due to the altitude, summers are not quite as hot as one might expect. Precipitation occurs mainly in summer. There is occasional frost at night in winter.

Demographics 2011
 Area: 
 Population: 549,575
 Households: 335,776
3.5% growth

Tourist hub

The city is located on major highway routes and close to 2 major centres, making it a hub for tourist activities.  Within the city are some historic churches and Mosque, including the Anglican Church (1871), the Dutch Reformed Church (1898–1903) and the Zinniaville Jamme Mosque in Zinniaville, the historic statue of the Voortrekker girl and the Rustenburg Museum. There are many Shopping centers which bring in an influx of people from around Rustenburg such as Waterfall mall, Rustenburg mall, Sun Central, Greystone Crossing and Platinum square where one can go shopping and dining. Rustenburg has much to entertain which include Golf Courses, hot Air ballooning, mountain climbing, hiking, the famous Ten Flags Theme park and much more. Rustenburg is also close to Magaliesburg which offers a number of restaurants and outdoor activities.

Communities and battlefields
There are several sites of cultural and historical significance in and around Rustenburg. Some of these related to the indigenous Bafokeng, Bakgatla and Botswana tribes, whose totemic tribal traditions are of interest. There is also the German community of Kroondal that traces its origins back to 1857.

A number of Anglo-Boer and ethnic war battles took place in the area with the districts of Koster, Swartruggens and Rustenburg featuring battlefields, memorial graves and ruined forts.  The area also has archaeological remains from the Iron Age and Stone Age.

Nature reserves
Key attractions in this area include the nature reserves around Rustenburg. This includes:
Kgaswane Nature Reserve is situated above the town of Rustenburg, In Waterfall Park, Cashan across a varied habitat of quartzite mountain peaks, it is open to hikers as well as vehicle visitors. It is a 4,257 ha reserve.
Madikwe Game Reserve and Groot Marico Park are large reserves north of the Pilanesberg, almost half the size of Belgium. They are conservation and transition zone between the Kalahari sandveld and the thornveld. Madikwe hosts all the major plains species, including the Big Five and has the second largest concentration of elephants in South Africa.
Pilanesberg Game Reserve is one of the most accessible South African game reserves. It is located a 1.5-hour drive from Johannesburg and Pretoria, outside Rustenburg. It is the fourth largest National Park in South Africa and is set in the Pilanesberg range, traversing the floor of a long-extinct volcano. Pilanesberg conserves all the major mammal species including lion, leopard, elephant, rhino and buffalo.

Holiday destination
Sun City and the Lost City resorts located within the crater of the dormant volcano which the Pilanesberg Game Reserve lies above. The complex is set on the slopes of a valley in the Pilanesberg Mountains. Sun City is a world renown destination by Sun International and remains one of the best resorts in Southern Africa. Tourist amenities include a shopping mall, casinos, the 'Valley of the Waves' and two championship golf courses.

Protea hotel hunters rest borders the Kgaswane Nature reserve. Just 5 km from Waterfall mall. There are many amenities at this resort including, hiking, swimming, golf, horse riding, and game drives.

Shopping

Waterfall Mall nestled in Waterfall Park of Cashan in Rustenburg. Offers indoor shopping with just around 200 shops to visit.

Platinum Square, Lifestyle Square, Rustenburg Square are all owned by a single company located within Rustenburg. These Shopping locations are central to different areas of the city and all offer anchor Supermarkets and a variety of other shops.

Boitekong Mall . Waterfall Mall, Phokeng Mall, Tlhabane Square- located in Tlhabane, Rustenburg Mall, Moruleng mall, Suncity village shopping centre,

Dining and Restaurants in Rustenburg

Rustenburg has many unique and multi cultural Restaurants and coffee shops. Mochachos Waterfall East located at the Greystone shopping centre just off the R24 Route is well known for their service and mouth watering Mexican cuisine. Rustenburg boasts a number of entertaining Pub & Grills one of which is  '4Shots Pub & Grill' known for Mouth watering pub lunches and family friendly entertainment, situated in van Belkum street East End

Sport

Rustenburg was one of the host cities of the 2010 FIFA World Cup with the 42,000-seat Royal Bafokeng Stadium.
Professional Football Clubs: Platinum Stars
Rustenburg is home to another world-class stadium, Olympia Park. It hosted some of the 1995 Rugby World Cup games.
Rustenburg Judo Club is one of the strongest clubs in South Africa, dominating the provincial team of North West Province and winning the most medals of any single club in South Africa in SA National Championships over the last 15 years.
Rustenburg Skydiving Club – a popular skydiving facility for sports skydiving and parachuting, tandem skydiving, Accelerated Freefall (AFF) and static line courses.
The Gary Player Country Club, located in nearby Sun City, hosts the annual Nedbank Golf Challenge, a round of the European Tour.
Rustenburg Golf Club which is located in the heart of the city has had a major renovation since it was leased to MH Tayob in 2017. The golf club has improved its revenue tremendously by improving its Courses and adding many other amenities such as, Park run, Put Put, Indoor trampoline park, many restaurants and a 4 star event and conference centre.
Rustenburg is home to 2 swimming clubs, Otters Rustenburg and Rustenburg Swimming Club.
Impala Cricket Club is a Cricket sports ground located next to Olympia Park Stadion

Development
Rustenburg is home to the two largest platinum mines in the world and the world's largest platinum refinery, PMR Home (Precious Metal Refiners), which processes around 70% of the world's platinum. As a result of the mining activity in this mineral-rich area, there is also an increased focus on social development. Rustenburg is one of only 5 South African cities to have a community foundation, called the Greater Rustenburg Community Foundation (GRCF), that seeks to ensure the regional development reaches all levels of society.

Transformation of Rustenburg into a Smart City
Rustenburg has been highly dependent on mining which is responsible for more than 65% of local GDP and 50% of all direct jobs. The secondary GDP contributors are, by a considerable margin, finance (9%) and retail (8%). Since Platinum mining is projected to decline after 2040, the Rustenburg Local Municipality formulated the Rustenburg Vision 2040 in 2014, with the goal of becoming a world-class green, efficient, sustainable and intricately interconnected Smart City where all communities enjoy a high quality of life. This includes the redevelopment and rejuvenation of existing CBD areas to new world-class commercial centres with a conspicuous signature skyline incorporating a plethora of high-rise landmark buildings and skyscrapers as part of the smart space planning and smart maximization of land usage that sustainably creates breathing room for people to move, live, work and play.

Rustenburg Rapid Transport Project (RRT)

As at the end of the 2017/18 financial year, the Rustenburg Metropolitan had spent about R2.7 billion on the upgrading of old and the construction of new public transport infrastructure in and around the city. The infrastructure includes  of bi-directional Transitway Rustenburg Rapid Transport (RRT) Bus rapid transit lanes, walk ways and 17 Sub-stations. After completion, 37 safe and clean enclosed stations on the trunk lines stations will be fully operational along  of road using at least 100 articulated buses to transport passengers along the main corridors. On completion of Phase 1 of the 4 phase project, the RRT is projected to deliver 225 000 passenger trips a day through 13 routes, 240 bus stops and 15 BRT stations using around 268 buses. While Bus rapid transit is one of the components of the RRT system design, it will not be an exclusively BRT driven operation. The routes have been planned to integrate with bus routes servicing townships, suburbs and outlying village areas as well as long-distance bus services, which will work in unison to move people around the city and region.

Transport
Rustenburg Airfield (FARG), situated in the middle part of the city, is the Rustenburg Local Municipality Airfield, licensed according to Civil Aviation Authority standards. Rustenburg SkyDiving Club operates every weekend year round from the airfield. It currently has a 1225m long and 15m runway and serves small planes for skydiving and parachuting. As part of Rustenburg's Aerodrome Master Plan, the Airfield will receive an upgrade.

It is located close to the Pilanesberg Game Reserve and mainly serves tourists visiting the Sun City resort. It has a 2750m long and 30m wide runway and handles about 8000 passengers per year.

Currently, international travelers to Rustenburg come predominantly via the O.R. Tambo International Airport.

Two interprovincial rail lines traverse Rustenburg. One is in the middle part of Rustenburg connecting Rustenburg eastwards to Brits and northwards to Thabazimbi, the other rail line runs through the eastern part of Rustenburg connecting it south-easterly to Krugersdorp and south-westerly to Koster. There is a possibility of upgrading the existing Rustenburg Railway network to better cater to passengers as part of the city's revitalization. Previously, the railway lines served long-distance passengers, but are now only used for transporting platinum and chrome concentrates to smelters.

The Rustenburg Rapid Transport (RRT) Bus rapid transit network will incorporate  (half bi-directional) transport networks, walk ways and 17 sub-stations with and over 260 buses.

Education
Schools in Rustenburg include:
 Boikagong Secondary School 
 Tlhabane West Primary School
 Abana primary school
 Bergsig Akademie/Academy
 Die Hoërskool Rustenburg
 HS Grenswag
 Zinniaville Secondary School
 Rustenburg Technical High School
 Grenville High School
 Rauwane Sepeng
 Fields College
 Selly Park Convent Primary School
 Selly Park Secondary School
 Geelhout Park High School
 H.F Tlou High School
 President Mangope Technical and Commercial High School
 Tlhabane Technical and Commercial High School
 Bafokeng High School
 Grenswag HS
 Lebone II College
 Rustenburg Educational College
 Kele Secondary School
 Meridian Private School
 J M Ntsime High School
 Keledi High School
 Vastrap primary
 Proteapark primary
 Deo Gloria Christian Academy
 Karlienpark Primary School
 Khayalethu Secondary School
 Bothibello Primary School
 Nur-ul-Iman Muslim School 
 Itumeleng Secondary School
 Tswaidi High School
 Mmanape High School
Motladi Kgoadi Goadi Primary School 
Bosabosele Primary School 
Nkukise Primary School
Matale Secondary School

Higher education & further education colleges include:
 University of South Africa Rustenburg Hub (UNISA)
 Platinum College
 Rock of Springs Technical College
 Boston City Campus
 Global Tech College
 Multi-Tech College
 Keobakile Nursing Academy
 MSC Business College
 Damelin Rustenburg
 ORBIT College Rustenburg
 Centurion Akademie
 Brooklyn City College Rustenburg
 Advisor Progressive College Rustenburg

Other Tertiary Education Institutions close to Rustenburg:
 North-West University
 University of Pretoria
 University of the Witwatersrand
 Tshwane University of Technology
 University of South Africa Main Campus
 Sefako Makgatho Health Sciences University
 University of Johannesburg

Notable people
Famous people with roots in Rustenburg include:
 Rory Alec – Christian broadcaster
Johan Botha – opera singer
Pik Botha – politician and foreign minister (1977–1994)
Bettie Cilliers-Barnard – painter
John Cranko – ballet choreographer
Rocky Malebana-Metsing – politician and human rights activist
Koos du Plessis – singer-songwriter
Frik du Preez – rugby union player
John Smit – Springbok rugby captain
Andre Stander – bank robber
Esta TerBlanche – actress
Sunette Viljoen – javelin thrower
Denise Zimba – television presenter (V Entertainment)
Renske Stoltz – netball player (for South Africa since 2015)
Dwaine Pretorius – cricket player (for South Africa since 2016)
Gerhard Mostert – former Springbok player. He is Wessel's Mostert's older brother

References

External links

Rustenburg Local Municipality
Rusties - Businesses, Events, Jobs, Specials, etc.

 
Populated places in the Rustenburg Local Municipality
Populated places established in 1851
1851 establishments in Africa
Smart cities